The Pinacanauan River is one of the rivers in the Philippines, and is a tributary of the Cagayan River. The river passes through the Peñablanca Protected Landscape and Seascape, with large karst formations, underground chambers, and rare wild flora. The Pinacanauan is considered one of the most picturesque attractions in Cagayan. 
 
Because of its moderate to medium-quick rapid farther upstream, it is a popular place for rafting and kayaking. The place is surrounded by mountains for hiking, climbing and spelunking. Boat races take place on this river every year on April 21.

References

Rivers of the Philippines
Landforms of Cagayan